The 2010–11 season will be Budapest Honvéd FC's 100th competitive season, 6th consecutive season in the Soproni Liga and 101st year in existence as a football club.

Team kit and logo
The team kits for the 2010–11 season are produced by Nike. The home kit is red and black colour and the away kit is white, red and black colour.

Squad

First team squad

League Cup squad

Club

Coaching staff

Top scorers
Includes all competitive matches. The list is sorted by shirt number when total goals are equal.

Last updated on 12 May 2011

Disciplinary record
Includes all competitive matches. Players with 1 card or more included only.

Last updated on 22 May 2011

Overall
{|class="wikitable"
|-
|Games played || 40 (30 Soproni Liga, 6 Hungarian Cup and 4 Hungarian League Cup)
|-
|Games won || 16 (11 Soproni Liga, 4 Hungarian Cup and 1 Hungarian League Cup)
|-
|Games drawn ||  8 (7 Soproni Liga, 1 Hungarian Cup and 0 Hungarian League Cup)
|-
|Games lost ||  16 (12 Soproni Liga, 1 Hungarian Cup and 3 Hungarian League Cup)
|-
|Goals scored || 59
|-
|Goals conceded || 57
|-
|Goal difference || +2
|-
|Yellow cards || 72
|-
|Red cards || 6
|-
|rowspan="3"|Worst discipline ||  Fernando Cuerda (2 , 3 )
|-
|  Jean-Baptiste Akassou (6 , 1 )
|-
|  Norbert Hajdú (6 , 1 )
|-
|rowspan="1"|Best result || 7–0 (H) v Eger FC – Hungarian Cup – 23 November 2010
|-
|rowspan="1"|Worst result || 0–4 (A) v Videoton FC Fehérvár – Hungarian Cup – 15 March 2011
|-
|rowspan="1"|Most appearances ||  Norbert Hajdú (36 appearances)
|-
|rowspan="1"|Top scorer ||  Danilo Cirino de Oliveira (8 goals)
|-
|Points || 56/120 (46.67%)
|-

Nemzeti Bajnokság I

Classification

Results summary

Results by round

Matches

Vasas SC: Végh – Zs. Balog, Arnaut, Gáspár, M. Katona (Mileusnic 30.) – Benounes (Mundi 70.), Pavicevic, Bakos – Hrepka (Phanktkhava 83.), Ferenczi, Lázok. Coach: Giovanni Dellacasa.
Budapest Honvéd FC: G. Németh – Á. Takács, Cuerda, Botis, Hajdú – Abass, Coira, Akassou, Conteh (Sadjo 62.), Rouani (Rufino 68.) – Bajner (Stokic 46.). Coach: Massimo Morales.
G.: Gáspár (9., 76.), Arnaut (36.) – Abass (16.), Á. Takács (83.)
Y.: C. Pavicevic (64.) – Akassou (12.), Conteh (59.), Botis (79.), Sadjo (86.)

Budapest Honvéd FC: Kemenes – Á. Takács, Debreceni, Cuerda,Sadjo – Abass, Akassou, Danilo (Conteh 82.), Moreira (Botis 55.), Hajdú – Rufino (Rouani 68.). Coach: Massimo Morales.
MTK Budapest FC: Szatmári – Vukadinovic, Sütő, Á. Pintér, A. Gál (Eppel 67.) – Vadnai, Pátkai, J. Kanta (Ladányi 75.) – Á. Szabó (Skriba 79.), Tischler, A. Pál. Coach: József Garami.
G.: Botis (62.) – J. Kanta (10. – pen.), Tischler (74.)
Y.: Cuerda (31.), Botis (89.) – Vukadinovic (20.), Pátkai (27.), A. Gál (41.), A. Pál (92.)
R.: Debreceni (9.), Cuerda (55.)

Ferencvárosi TC: Ranilović – Balog (Rodenbücher 59.), Csizmadia, Tutoric, Junior (Kulcsár 25.) – Maróti (Abdi 68.), Józsi, Stanic, Andrezinho – Rósa, Heinz. Coach: László Prukner.
Budapest Honvéd FC: Kemenes – Takács, Cséke, Botis, Hajdú – Coira, Akassou, Danilo (Bajner 76.), Sadjo (Conteh 70.) – Rouani (Abass 67.), Rufino. Coach: Massimo Morales.
G.: Kulcsár (51.) – Rufino (8.), Hajdú (13. – pen.), Rouani (33.)
Y.: Junior (12.), Csizmadia (43.), Heinz (79.) – Sadjo (23.)
R.: Stanic (40.)

Budapest Honvéd FC: Kemenes – Takács, Botis, Cuerda, Hajdú – Danilo (Bojtor 88.), Coira, Rufino, Akassou, Sadjo – Rouani (Abass 85.). Coach: Massimo Morales.
Debreceni VSC: Malinauskas – Nagy, Simac, Szűcs, Fodor – Kulcsár (Ramos 46.), Spitzmüller, Bódi, Rezes – Farkas (Coulibaly 46.), Szilágyi (Balajti 63.). Coach: András Herczeg.
G.: Coira (22.)
Y.: Akassou (25.), Rufino (77.) – Fodor (37.), Spitzmüller (85.)

Szolnoki MÁV FC: Kövesfalvi – Schindler, Hegedűs (Koós 22.), Pető, Balogh – Remili, Búrány, Pisanjuk (Lengyel 57.), Hevesi-Tóth, Tchami (Antal 65.) – Alex. Coach: Attila Vágó.
Budapest Honvéd FC: Kemenes – Botis, Takács, Cuerda, Hajdú – Danilo (Conteh 75.), Coira, Akassou, Sadjo – Rufino, Rouani (Abass 73.). Coach: Massimo Morales.
G.: Sadjo (21.), Rufino (88.)
Y.: Pető (36.), Schindler (63.), Hevesi-Tóth (74.) – Rufino (41.), Cuerda (46.), Danilo (77.)

Budapest Honvéd FC: Kemenes – Takács, Cuerda, Botis, Hajdú – Abass, Coira, Akassou, Sadjo – Danilo, Rouani (Rufino 77.). Coach: Massimo Morales.
Zalaegerszegi TE: Vlaszák – Kovács (Simon 54.), Bogunovic, Miljatovic, Panikavar (Balázs 74.) – Szalai, Máté, Kamber, Illés – Rajcomar (Horváth 43.), Pavicevic. Coach: János Csank.
G.: Abass (22.)
Y.: Kemenes (32.), Takács (57.), Danilo (83.) – Rajcomar (19.), Pavicevic (32.), Horváth (81.), Bogunovic (83.), Máté (90.), Illés (90.)
R.: Szalai (38.)

Szombathelyi Haladás: Rózsa – Schimmer, Guzmics, Korolovszky, Tóth – Rajos, Irhás (Obric 68.), Á. Simon – Nagy, Kenesei, Oross (Sipos 77.). Coach: Aurél Csertői.
Budapest Honvéd FC: Kemenes – Takács, Botis, Cuerda, Hajdú – Abass (Danilo 57.), Akassou, Coira, Sadjo – Rufino (Conteh 61.), Rouani (Bojtor 85.). Coach: Massimo Morales.
G.: Tóth (28.) – Coria (61.)
Y.: Kenesei (60.), Á. Simon (87.) – Abass (52.), Cuerda (60.)

Budapest Honvéd FC: Kemenes – Takács, Cuerda, Debreceni, Hajdú – Abass, Coira, Akassou (Conteh 77.), Sadjo (Rufino 65.) – Rouani, Danilo. Coach: Massimo Morales.
Lombard-Pápa TFC: Szűcs – Takács, Bíró, Farkas, Németh – Quintero, Gyömbér, Bárányos – Abwo (Rebryk 65.), Heffler (Venczel 92.), Maric. Coach: György Véber.
G.: Abass (26., 61.) – Maric (7.), Bárányos (22., 57.), Heffler (72.)
Y.: Takács (60.), Cuerda (90.) – Farkas (51.), Heffler (60.)
R.: Cuerda (92.)

Paksi SE: Csernyánszki – Fiola, Éger, Sifter, Csehi – Bartha (Böde 60.), Sipeki, Heffler, Vayer – Kiss (Nagy 77.), Montvai. Coach: Károly Kis.
Budapest Honvéd FC: Kemenes – Sós, Botis, Debreceni, Hajdú – Abass, Coira, Akassou, Sadjo (Bojtor 77.) – Rouani (Danilo 69.), Rufino (Horváth 86.). Coach: Massimo Morales.
G.: Bojtor (81.)
Y.: Sadjo (14.)

Budapest Honvéd FC: Kemenes – Takács, Debreceni, Botis, Hajdú – Abass, Akassou, Coira (Conteh 72.), Danilo – Rouani (Bojtor 79.), Rufino (Sadjo 60.). Coach: Massimo Morales.
Kecskeméti TE: Rybánsky – Némedi, Gyagya, Balogh (Lambulic 46.), Mohl – Bori, Ebala (Alempijevic 54.), Cukic – Foxi, Tököli (Litsingi 84.), Bertus. Coach: Tomislav Sivic.
G.: Rouani (49.) – Tököli (18., 43.)
Y.: Akassou (61.) – Ebala (45.), Foxi (78.)
R.: Akassou (78.)

Kaposvári Rákóczi FC: Kovács – Gujic (Kovácsevics 9.), Okuka, Grúz, Zsók – Hegedűs, Kulcsár, Pavlovic, Jawad (Balázs 79.) – Oláh (Szepessy 86.), Peric. Coach: Tibor Sisa.
Budapest Honvéd FC: Kemenes – Takács, Debreceni, Botis, Hajdú – Moreira, Abass (Rufino 90.), Horváth, Coira, Sadjo (Bojtor 85.) – Rouani (Danilo 43.). Coach: Massimo Morales.
G.: —
Y.: Pavlovic (61.) – Coria (40.), Sadjo (83.), Moreira (89.)
R.: Pavlovic (68.)

Videoton FC Fehérvár: Bozovic – Lázár, Lipták, Vaskó, Andic – Gosztonyi (Sándor 60.), Farkas, Elek, Polonkai (Djordjic 68.) – Alves, Nikolic (Mutumba 60.). Coach: György Mezey.
Budapest Honvéd FC: Kemenes – Takács, Botis, Debreceni, Hajdú – Abass (Rufino 90.), Coira (Horváth 66.), Moreira, Danilo – Bojtor, Rouani (Bajner 83.). Coach: Massimo Morales.
G.: Danilo (52., 57.)
Y.: Andic (66.) – Danilo (11.), Coira (43.), Moreira (74.)

Budapest Honvéd FC: Kemenes – Takács, Debreceni, Botis, Hajdú – Abass, Horváth (Akassou 72.), Moreira, Danilo – Bojtor (Sadjo 79.), Rouani (Rufino 75.). Coach: Massimo Morales.
Győri ETO FC: Radosavljevic – Fehér, Stanisic, Eugene, Völgyi – Copa, Kiss (Ji-Paraná 46.), Pilibaitis, Koltai (Aleksidze 65.) – Ceolin (Marinelli 59.), Bouguerra. Coach: Attila Pintér.
G.: Hajdú (48. – pen.) – Völgyi (67.)
Y.: Copa (20.), Bouguerra (34.)

Újpest FC: Balajcza – Szokol, Takács, Vermes, Pollák (Kiss 71.) – Böőr (Matos 70.), Tajthy, Rajczi, Mitrovic, Simon (Sitku 79.) – Tisza. Coach: Géza Mészöly.
Budapest Honvéd FC: Kemenes – Takács, Botis, Debreceni, Hajdú – Danilo (Bajner 80.), Akassou, Coira (Abass 46.), Sadjo – Rouani, Bojtor (Moreira 51.). Coach: Massimo Morales.
G.: Hajdú (40. – og.), Böőr (45.), Rajczi (53. – pen.) – Bajner (82.)
Y.: Pollák (19.) – Danilo (52.)

Budapest Honvéd FC: Kemenes – Takács, Debreceni, Botis, Hajdú – Abass, Akassou, Horváth (Hidi 58.), Moreira – Bojtor (Sadjo 60.; Bajner 75.), Danilo. Coach: László Szalai.
BFC Siófok: Molnár – Mogyorósi (Kocsis 85.), Graszl, Márton, Novák – Csermelyi (Homma 66.), Tusori, Lukács, Ivancsics – Sowunmi, Délczeg (Horváth 91.). Coach: István Mihalecz.
G.: Délczeg (40.)
Y.: Akassou (71.), Hajdú (76.) – Mogyorósi (47.), Márton (68.), Graszl (72.)

Budapest Honvéd FC: Kemenes – Takács, Debreceni, Botis, Hajdú – Hidi, Coira, Akassou – Rouani (Nagy 83.), Rufino (Czár 46.), Abass (Danilo 75.). Coach: László Szalai.
Vasas SC: Végh – Balog, Arnaut, Gáspár, Polényi – Arsic (Katona 88.), Dobric (Mundi 75.), Pavicevic, Németh – Lázok, Beliczky (Kovács 90.). Coach: András Komjáti.
G.: —
Y.: Pavicevic (81.)

MTK Budapest FC: Szatmári – Vukadinovic (Hajdú 87.), Szekeres, Sütő, Vadnai – Kanta, Pátkai, A. Pál, Vukmir, Frank (Urbán 64.) – Tischler (Eppel 76.). Coach: József Garami.
Budapest Honvéd FC: Tóth – Moga (Horváth 42.), Debreceni, Lovric, Hajdú – Sadjo, Akassou, Moreira, Ivancsics (G. Nagy 80.) – Danilo, Bright (Rouani 52.). Coach: Attila Supka.
G.: Sütő (43.), Urbán (76.), Eppel (90.+1) – Lovric (25.)
Y.: Szekeres (79.), Urbán (84.) – Debreceni (55.), Horváth (82.)

Budapest Honvéd FC: Tóth – Lovric, Debreceni, Botis, Hajdú – G. Nagy (Danilo 55.), Hidi (Zelenka 55.), Ivancsics, Akassou, Moreira (Vólent 68.) – Bright. Coach: Attila Supka.
Ferencvárosi TC: Ranilović – Csizmadia, Tutoric, Balog – Stanic, Maróti, Rósa, Józsi (Tóth 65.) – Schembri, Heinz (Andrezinho 83.), Miljkovic (Abdi 68.). Coach: László Prukner.
G.: Stanic (12.)
Y.: Botis (61.), Lovric (79.), Hajdú (88.), Zelenka (89.), Akassou (92.) – Ranilović (75.), Csizmadia (79.), Abdi (93.)

Debreceni VSC: Novakovic – Bernáth, Simac, Mijadinoski, Fodor – Czvitkovics, Varga, Ramos (Salami 46.), Szakály (Dombi 77.) – Kabát, Yannick (Farkas 62.). Coach: Zdenek Scasny.
Budapest Honvéd FC: Kemenes – Lovric, Debreceni, Botis, Hajdú – G. Nagy (Sadjo 78.), Akassou (Hidi 46.), Zelenka (Moreira 52.), Horváth, Ivancsics – Danilo. Coach: Attila Supka.
G.: Czvitkovics (45.), Salami (47.) – Debreceni (21.), Hajdú (62.)
Y.: Bernáth (78.) – Hidi (65.), Lovric (75.)

Budapest Honvéd FC: Kemenes – Lovric, Debreceni, Botis, Hajdú – Zelenka (Bright 58.), Akassou, Ivancsics (Fieber 72.), G. Nagy (Kapacina 58.) – Danilo, Moreira. Coach: Attila Supka.
Szolnoki MÁV FC: Melnichenko – Đurovic, Máté, Milicic, Vukomanovic – Búrány, Némedi, Fitos (Balogh 90.), Remili – Zsolnai (Tchami 77.), Jokic (Szalai 88.). Coach: Antal Simon.
G.: —
Y.: Fieber (76.)

Zalaegerszegi TE: Sipos – Kocsárdi (Rajcomar 46.), Miljatovic (Kovács 46.), Varga, Panikvar – A. Delic, Szalai (Horváth 55.), Simonfalvi, Kamber, Balázs – Turkovs. Coach: János Csank.
Budapest Honvéd FC: Kemenes – Sadjo (Vólent 56.), Debreceni, Botis, Hajdú – Moreira, Akassou, Zelenka (G. Nagy 46.), Horváth, Ivancsics – Rouani (Bajner 75.). Coach: Attil Supka.
G.: Turkovs (52.), Kamber (85.) – Akassou (87. – pen.)
Y.: Kocsárdi (20.), Kamber (81.), Panikvar (85.) – Akassou (22.), Hajdú (34.), Horváth (53.)
R.: Hajdú (64.)

Budapest Honvéd FC: Kemenes – Lovric, Debreceni, Botis, Sadjo – Moreira (G. Nagy 77.), Hidi, Zelenka (Labudovic 87.), Horváth, Ivancsics – Brigh (Vólent 80.). Coach: Attila Supka.
Szombathelyi Haladás: Rózsa – II Nagy, Lengyel, Korolovszky, Tóth – Irhás (Sipos 46.), Á. Simon (Molnár 75.), Halmosi, Sluka – Kenesei, Fodrek. Coach: Zoltán Aczél.
G.: Lovric (40., 69.), Ivancsics (78.) – Halmosi (75.)
Y.: Lovric (47.), Sadjo (56.) – II Nagy (25.), Á. Simon (34.), Lengyel (43.), Sipos (72.)

Lombard-Pápa TFC: Szűcs – Nagy (P. Takács 66.), Quintero (Szabó 53.), Dlusztus, Supic, Németh – Zulevs (Bali 79.), Gyömbér, Bárányos – Maric, Heffler. Coach: György Véber.
Budapest Honvéd FC: Kemenes – Lovric, Debreceni, Botis, Hajdú – Moreira (G. Nagy 70.), Hidi, Zelenka, Horváth (Akassou 77.), Ivancsics – Bright (Vólent 66.). Coach: Attila Supka.
G.: Bright (20.)
Y.: Heffler (22.), P. Takács (90.+4) – Moreira (15.), Horváth (60.), Lovric (69.), Vólent (90.+3)

Budapest Honvéd FC: Kemenes – Lovric, Botis, Debreceni, Hajdú – Moreira, Horváth (Akassou 69.), Zelenka (Sadjo 81.), Hidi, Ivancsics – Bright (Vólent 61.). Coach: Attila Supka.
Paksi SE: Csernyánszki – Heffler, Éger, Fiola, Szabó – Magasföldi, Sifter, Böde (Nagy 67.), Sipeki (Báló 28.) – Kiss (Haraszti 67.), Vayer. Coach: Károly Kis.
G.: Lovric (33.)
Y.: Ivancsics (88.), Debreceni (90.+2) – Nagy (35.), Fiola (41.)

Kecskeméti TE: Rybánsky – Alempijevic (Bertus 78.), Radanovic, Balogh, Mohl – Bori (Dosso 57.), Ebala, Litsingi (Vujovic 65.), Cukic, Foxi – Tököli. Coach: Tomislav Sivic.
Budapest Honvéd FC: Kemenes – Lovric, Botis, Debreceni, Hajdú – Moreira (Sadjo 53.), Hidi, Zelenka (G. Nagy 79.), Horváth, Ivancsics – Bright (Danilo 27.). Coach: Attila Supka.
G.: Mohl (27.), Sadjo (84. – o.g.) – Zelenka (29.)
Y.: Cukic (38.), Tököli (76.), Vujovic (81.) – Zelenka (38.), G. Nagy (82.)

Budapest Honvéd FC: Kemenes – Lovric, Botis, Debreceni, Hajdú – Moreira (G. Nagy 88.), Horváth, Zelenka, Hidi, Ivancsics – Danilo (Vólent 74.). Coach: Attila Supka.
Kaposvári Rákóczi FC: Kovács – Okuka, Grúz, Zsók, Gujic (Korhut 64.) – Pavlovic (Jawad 77.), Hegedűs, Máté, Balázs (Grumic 57.) – Oláh, Peric. Coach: Tibor Sisa.
G.: Danilo (53.)
Y.: Zelenka (83.) – Pavlovic (58.), Peric (81.)

Budapest Honvéd FC: Kemenes – Lovric, Botis, Debreceni, Hajdú – Moreira (G. Nagy 89.), Hidi, Zelenka, Horváth (Akassou 75.), Ivancsics – Danilo. Coach: Attila Supka.
Videoton FC Fehérvár: Bozovic – Lázár, Lipták, Vaskó, Andic – Gosztonyi, Sándor, Elek (Lencse 75.), Vasiljevic (Farkas 63.) – Alves, Nikolic (Polonkai 63.). Coach: György Mezey.
G.: Zelenka (31.), Ivancsics (43.) – Alves (10.), Gosztonyi (13.)
Y.: Botis (33.), Danilo (33.) – Nikolic (12.), Andic (23.), Vaskó (41.)

Győri ETO FC: Stevanovic – Takács, Dordevic, Fehér, Völgyi – Kiss (Tokody 83.), Ji-Paraná, Pilibaitis, Dinjar (Dudás 80.) – Koltai (Ceolin 84.), Aleksidze. Coach: Aurél Csertői.
Budapest Honvéd FC: Kemenes – Lovric, Botis, Debreceni, Hajdú – Moreira (Erdélyi 60.), Horváth (Akassou 66.), Vécsei, Hidi, Ivancsics – Bright (Vólent 60.). Coach: Attila Supka.
G.: Völgyi (48.), Kiss (57.), Aleksidze (62.)
Y.: —

Budapest Honvéd FC: Kemenes – Lovric, Botis, Debreceni, Hajdú – Moreira (G. Nagy 27.), Horváth, Zelenka (Vécsei 46.), Hidi (Bright 71.), Ivancsics – Danilo. Coach: Attila Supka.
Újpest FC: Balajcza – Szokol, Litauszki, Takács, Pollák (Tajthy 28.) – Balajti (Rajczi 59.), Mitrovic, Egerszegi (Szalai 61.), Balogh – Lázár, Ahjupera. Coach: Géza Mészöly.
G.: Danilo (57.) – Ahjupera (9.), Balogh (36.), Balajti (40.), Rajczi (88.)
Y.: Horváth (40.), Hajdú (50.), Botis (68.) – Tajthy (38.)

BFC Siófok: Molnár – Mogyorósi, Márton (Graszl 55.), Fehér, Novák – Csordás, Tusori, Ludánszki (László 46.), Melczer – Homma, Délczeg (Isaac 75.). Coach: István Mihalecz.
Budapest Honvéd FC: Kemenes – Akassou, Lovric, Debreceni, Hajdú – Danilo, Hidi, Zelenka (G. Nagy 35.), Horváth, Ivancsics (Czár 81.) – Vernes (Vécsei 71.). Coach: Attila Supka.
G.: Homma (40.) – Danilo (6.), Délczeg (51. – og.), Czár (90.)
Y.: Mogyorósi (18.), Novák (24.), Márton (46.), Melczer (67.), Tusori (87.) – Zelenka (25.), Vernes (48.)

Hungarian Cup

Third round

Budaörsi SC: Kozma – Pleván, L. Horváth (Kiss 38.), Lászka, Lőrincz (Papp 80.) – Tüske, Melczer, Csobánki, Hegedűs (Sándor 74.) – Mihályi, Farkas. Coach: Tamás Lucsánszky.
Budapest Honvéd FC: Tóth – Sós, Debreceni, Botis, Hajdú – Abass, Horváth (Coira 46.), Moreira, Bojtor – Conteh (Danilo 71.), Rufino (Sadjo 54.). Coach: Massimo Morales.
G.: Tüske (71.) – Conteh (4.), Debreceni (89.)
Y.: Pleván (79.), Farkas (88.) – Hajdú (54.), Moreira (90.)
R.: Mihályi (91.)

Fourth round

Putnoki VSE: Roza – Sebők (Lenkey 88.), Nagy, Hanász, Boczki – Madarász, Balogh, Gál, Mészáros (Darai 63.) – Monyók (Zimányi 64.), Sápi. Coach: Péter Koszta.
Budapest Honvéd FC: Tóth – Horváth, Debreceni, Cséke, Hajdú – Moreira, Akassou, Danilo, Conteh (Rouani 66.) – Bojtor, Rufino (Sadjo 58.). Coach: Massimo Morales.
G.: Sápi (90.) – Danilo (4., 95., 117.)
Y.: Madarász (32.), Roza (80.) – Hajdú (35.), Sadjo (80.), Bojtor (89.)

Fifth round

First leg

Eger FC: Illyés – Debreceni, Káposzta, Kiskapusi, Szűcs – Romhányi (Kotula 80.), Zováth, Vén (Kéki 70.), Busai – Bardi, Hamar (Bezzeg 65.). Coach: István László.
Budapest Honvéd FC: Tóth – Horváth, Debreceni, Cuerda, Sadjo – Akassou, Coira – Sós, Rufino (Rouani 57.), Bojtor – Bajner (Botis 71.). Coach: Massimo Morales.
G.: Bajner (63.), Akassou (70. – pen.), Rouani (75.)
Y.: Romhányi (55.), Káposzta (70.)
R.: Cuerda (68.)

Second leg

Budapest Honvéd FC: Tóth – Baráth, Cséke, Debreceni, Hajdú (Czár 54.) – Horváth (Nagy 63.) – Sós, Coira, Stokic – Rouani, Rufino (Hidi 59.). Coach: László Szalai.
Eger FC: Illyés (Gömöri 46.) – Debreceni, Káposzta, Kiskapusi, Busai – Kálmán (Halász 84.), Bezzeg, Kéki, Hamar – Romhányi, Kotula (Szilágyi 76.). Coach: István László.
G.: Rufino (4., 27.), Cséke (29. – pen., 42.), Rouani (45., 88.), Stokic (80.)
Y.: Rouani (64.)

Budapest Honvéd FC won 10–0 on aggregate.

Quarter-final

First leg

Budapest Honvéd FC: Kemenes – Horváth (Akassou 62.), Botis, Hajdú, Lovric – Debreceni, Hidi, Sadjo, Vólent (Bright 78.) – Danilo (Azevedo 62.), Zelenka. Coach: Attila Supka.
Videoton FC Fehérvár: Bozovic – Hidvégi, Lipták, Lázár, Vaskó – Vasiljevic, Szakály (Gosztonyi 62.), Sándor, Milanovic (Polonkai 46.) – Djordjic (Nikolic 46.), Lencse. Coach: György Mezey.
G.: Zelenka (22.) – Nikolic (71.)
Y.: Zelenka (85.)

Second leg

Videoton FC Fehérvár: Bozovic – Anđic, Vaskó, Milanovic, Izing – Szakály, Polonkai, Sándor, Gosztonyi (Gyurcsó 61.) – Lencse (B. Elek 81.), Alves (Vasiljevic 46.). Coach: György Mezey.
Budapest Honvéd FC: Kemenes – Akassou, Botis, Lovric, Debreceni – Hajdú, Horváth (Sadjo 46.), Ivancsics (Fieber 72.), Moreira – Bright (Danilo 46.), Vólent. Coach: Attila Supka.
G.: Gosztonyi (3.), Lencse (27., 80.), Gyurcsó (90.)
Y.: Gosztonyi (48.), Vaskó (79.) – Lovric (45.), Akassou (53.), Vólent (59.), Ivancsics (64.)

Videoton FC Fehérvár won 5–1 on aggregate.

League Cup

Group stage

Budapest Honvéd FC: Kunsági – Baráth, Cséke, Sós, Bojtor – Azevedo, A. Horváth (Debreceni 70.), Hidi, Vólent (Conteh 65.) – Bajner, Haruna. Coach: Massimo Morales.
Szolnoki MÁV FC: Tarczy – B. Szalai, Gy. Hegedűs, Pető, Cornaci (P. Balogh 80.) – Búrány (Benedek 86.), Z. Molnár, Antal, Mile – Hevesi-Tóth, Koós (Blaskovits 83.). Coach: Attila Vágó.
G.: Haruna (32.) – Koós (60.), Pető (70.)
Y.: Cséke (38.), A. Horváth (67.) – Mile (22.), Búrány (52.)

Kecskeméti TE: Z. Tóth – Bori (I. Farkas 60.), Gyagya, Koncz, Alempijevic (Foxi 46.) – Cukic (Tölgyesi 46.), Bertus, Bagi, Wilson – A. Simon (Ebala 10.), Dosso (T. Szabó 60.). Coach: István Urbányi.
Budapest Honvéd FC: Kunsági – Baráth (G. Nagy 46.), Remes, Cséke, Czár (A. Nagy 46.) – Sós, Hidi, A. Horváth (Azevedo 46.), Bojtor (M. Farkas 75.) – Vólent, Haruna (Vernes 72.). Coach: Krisztián Gabala.
G.: Wilson (32., 69.), A. Simon (33.), Koncz (43.) – Haruna (46.), Vólent (66.)
Y.: Cséke (45.)

Szolnoki MÁV FC: Tarczy – Molnár (Mile 62.), Rokszin, Ngalle (Hevesi-Tóth 46.), Alex (Kalmár 46.) – Stanisic, Vörös, Antal (Koós 62.), Búrány – Tchami (Lengyel 46.), Ramili. Coach: Antal Simon.
Budapest Honvéd FC: Kunsági – Baráth, Debreceni, Cséke (Varga 62.), Hajdú – Sós (Nagy 46.), Hidi, Horváth (Tisza 75.), Czár (Bojtor 46.) – Bajner (Moreira 56.), Rufino. Coach: László Szalai.
G.: Remili (33.), Ngalle (43.), Hevesi-Tóth (63.) – Rufino (21., 47., 60.), Nagy (76.)
Y.: Rokszin (42.)
R.: Vörös (90.)

Budapest Honvéd FC: Kemenes – Takács (Varga 62.), Debreceni, Cséke, Hajdú – Sós (Vólent 53.), Horváth (Bojtor 65.), Hidi, Akassou (Nagy 70.) – Rufino (Rouani 78.), Abass. Coach: László Szalai.
Kecskeméti TE: Tóth – Koszó, Balogh, Gyagya, Mohl (Farkas 66.) – Ebala, Savic (Bertus 46.), Litsingi (Dosso 46.), Foxi (Patvaros 62.) – Alempijevic, Tököli (Csordás 46.). Coach: Tomislav Sivic.
G.: Alempijevic (25.), Dosso (56.)
Y.: Hajdú (70.) – Mohl (31.), Tököli (41.), Alempijevic (68.), Balogh (75.), Koszó (89.)

References

External links
 Eufo
 Official Website
 UEFA
 fixtures and results

2010–11
Hungarian football clubs 2010–11 season